MYSA or variants may refer to:

 Mathare Youth Sports Association, in Nairobi, Kenya
 MySA, a web site of the San Antonio Express-News in San Antonio, Texas
 Malaysian Space Agency, the national space agency of Malaysia
 Mysa Nal, the name of the White Witch, a fictional comic book character in the DC Universe
 Mysa, a water buffalo character in The Jungle Book by Rudyard Kipling